Hamilton Municipal Airport , opened in 1963, is a village-owned, public-use airport located one nautical mile (1.85 km) northeast of the central business district of Hamilton, a village in the Town of Hamilton, Madison County, New York, United States.

Although many U.S. airports use the same three-letter location identifier for the FAA and IATA, this facility is assigned VGC by the FAA but has no designation from the IATA.

Facilities and aircraft 
It has one runway designated 17/35 with a grooved asphalt surface measuring 5,314 by 75 feet (1,620 x 23 m) and a full-length taxiway. The airport is illuminated for night flying by pilot-controlled lighting (PCL), activated on the 122.7 MHz frequency (medium-intensity edge lighting and runway end indicator lights). Precision approach path indicators are available for visual approaches in both directions. Automated weather advisories, from an AWOS-3 device, are continuously broadcast on 119.42 MHz.

Fuel (100LL Avgas and Jet A) is available during the airport's opening hours of 0900-1700 local, seven days a week.

For the 12-month period ending May 23, 2019, the airport had 17,310 aircraft operations, an average of 47 per day: 99.9% general aviation and 0.1% military. At that time there were 46 aircraft based at this airport: 92% single-engine, 4% multi-engine, and 4% gliders.

References

External links 
  at NYSDOT Airport Directory 
 Aerial image as of April 1994 from USGS The National Map
 Web site of the Village of Hamilton Airport Commission
 
 

Airports in New York (state)
Buildings and structures in Madison County, New York
Transportation in Madison County, New York